Goomeribong is a locality in the Gympie Region, Queensland, Australia.

History 

Land in Goomeribong was open for selection on 17 April 1877;  were available.

In July 1906, 32 allotments were advertised for selection by the Department of Public Lands Office. The map advertising the land selection states the allotments are portions in the Parishes of Murgon, Goomeribong and Barambah. The portions were left over from 5 April 1906.

References

External links 

Gympie Region
Localities in Queensland